This is a list of Asian auto racing and moto racing circuits sorted by country.

Azerbaijan

Street circuits
 Baku City Circuit, Baku
 Baku World Challenge, Baku

Bahrain
 Bahrain International Circuit, Bahrain

China

Street circuits
 Beijing International Street Circuit, Beijing
 Haitang Bay Circuit, Sanya
 Jingkai Street Circuit, Beijing
 Shanghai Street Circuit, Shanghai
 Wuhan Street Circuit, Wuhan
 Zhuhai Street Circuit, Zhuhai

Permanent circuits
 Chengdu Goldenport Circuit, Chengdu
 Goldenport Park Circuit, Beijing
 Guangdong International Circuit, between Zhaoqing and Sanshui
 Ordos International Circuit, Ordos City
 Shanghai International Circuit, Shanghai
 Tianma Circuit, Shanghai
 Zhuhai International Circuit, Zhuhai

Georgia

 Rustavi International Motorpark

India

Permanent tracks
 Buddh International Circuit, National Capital Region
 Irungattukottai Race Track, Chennai
 Kari Motor Speedway, Coimbatore

Street circuits
 Hyderabad Street Circuit, Hyderabad

Inactive tracks
 Sholavaram Airstrip, North Chennai

Indonesia

Permanent circuits

 Sentul International Circuit, Bogor

Street circuits

 Jakarta International e-Prix Circuit, Ancol
 Mandalika International Street Circuit, Mandalika

Inactive circuits
 Jakarta Street Circuit, Lippo Karawaci

Japan

 Asama Kazan, Tsumagoi, Gunma Prefecture
 Asan Circuit, Miyoshi District, Tokushima, Tokushima Prefecture, Shikoku
 Autopolis, Hita District, Ōita Prefecture
 Central Circuit, Taka District, Hyōgo Prefecture
 Ebisu Circuit, Nihonmatsu, Fukushima Prefecture,
 Fuji Speedway, Oyama, Shizuoka Prefecture
 Hokkaido Speed Park, Kutchan, Abuta District, Shiribeshi, Hokkaido
 Honda Safety & Riding Plaza Kyūshū, Kikuchi District, Kumamoto Prefecture
 Inagawa Circuit, Inagawa, Kawabe District, Hyōgo Prefecture
 Nasu Motor Sports Land, Kuroiso, Tokushima, Tochigi Prefecture
 Nakayama Circuit, Wake District, Okayama Prefecture
 Nihonkai Maze Circuit, Nishikanbara District, Niigata Prefecture
 Sportsland SUGO, Murata, Miyagi Prefecture
 SPA Naoiri, Naoiri, Ōita Prefecture
 Spa Nishiura Motor Park, Gamagōri, Aichi Prefecture
 Suzuka Circuit, Suzuka, Mie Prefecture
 TI Circuit, Aida, Okayama Prefecture
 Tokachi International Speedway, Sarabetsu, Hokkaido
 Tsukuba Circuit, Shimotsuma, Ibaraki Prefecture
 Twin Ring Motegi, Motegi, Tochigi Prefecture

Inactive Circuit
 Mine Circuit, Mine, Yamaguchi Prefecture
 Sendai Hi-Land Raceway, Aoba-ku, Sendai, Miyagi Prefecture
 Yatabe Test Track, Tsukuba, Ibaraki Prefecture

Kazakhstan
 Sokol International Racetrack, Almaty

Korea, South

Street circuits
 Changwon
 Seoul Street Circuit, Seoul

Permanent circuits
 Everland Speedway, Yongin
 Inje Speedium, Inje
 Korea International Circuit, Yeongam
 Taebaek Racing Park, Taebaek

Kuwait
 Kuwait Motor Town

Macau
 Guia Circuit, Macau (see also Macau Grand Prix)

Malaysia

Permanent tracks
 Melaka International Motorsport Circuit, Melaka
 Pasir Gudang Circuit, Johor Bahru
 Sepang International Circuit, Kuala Lumpur

Street circuits
 Kuala Lumpur Street Circuit, Kuala Lumpur
 Putrajaya Street Circuit, Putrajaya

Inactive tracks
 Shah Alam Circuit, Shah Alam

Philippines
 Batangas Racing Circuit, Batangas City
 Carmona Racing Circuit, Carmona, Cavite
 Clark International Speedway, Angeles, Pampanga
 Pampanga International Circuit, Porac, Pampanga
 Subic International Raceway, Subic, Zambales
 Palawan International Circuit, Puerto Princesa, Palawan

Qatar
 Losail International Circuit, Doha

Saudi Arabia

Permanent tracks
 Jeddah Raceway, Jeddah
 Reem International Circuit, Riyadh

Street circuits
 Jeddah Street Circuit, Jeddah
 Riyadh Street Circuit, Diriyah

Singapore
 Marina Bay Street Circuit
 Thomson Road Grand Prix circuit
 Changi racing circuit (suspended)

Thailand

Permanent tracks
 Chang International Circuit (BRIC), Buriram 
 Bira International Circuit, Pattaya
 Thailand Circuit (Nakhon Chai Sri Motor Sport Complex), Nakhon Chai Sri, Nakhon Pathom
 Kaeng Krachan Circuit, Phetchaburi
 Chiangrai Circuit Raceway, Mae Lao

Street circuits
 Bangsaen Street Circuit, (Bangsaen Grand Prix) Chonburi Province

Historic circuits
 Bonanza International Speedway, Nakhon Ratchasima

Turkey

 Istanbul Park, Tuzla
 İzmir Park, İzmir
 İzmit Körfez Circuit, Körfez

United Arab Emirates
 Dubai Autodrome
 Yas Marina Circuit, Abu Dhabi (see also Abu Dhabi Grand Prix)

Vietnam

 Hanoi Street Circuit

Other articles

 List of motor racing tracks
 List of motor racing tracks in Africa

References

Asia
Motorsport in Asia